Harrisburg Cemetery, sometimes referred to as Mount Kalmia Cemetery, is a prominent rural cemetery and national historic district in Harrisburg, Pennsylvania, located at 13th and Liberty streets in the Allison Hill/East Harrisburg neighborhoods of the city.  It was officially founded in 1845, although interments took place for many years before. The cemetery is also the burial ground for American Revolutionary War soldiers.
The caretaker's cottage was built in 1850. It was designed by famed 19th Century architect, Andrew Jackson Downing, in the Gothic Revival style.

It was listed on the National Register of Historic Places in 1985.

Notable burials

 Edward E. Beidleman (1873–1929), Pennsylvania State Representative and State Senator, 12th lieutenant Governor of Pennsylvania
 George Grey Barnard (1863–1938), prominent American sculptor, he completed several figures for the new state capitol in 1912.
 Jacob D. Boas (1806–1887), State Senator and Mayor of Harrisburg.
 John Conrad Bucher (1792–1844), Jacksonian member of the U.S. House of Representatives from Pennsylvania.
 James Donald Cameron (1833–1918), American politician, son of Simon Cameron; served as Secretary of War and U.S. Senator from Pennsylvania.
 Simon Cameron (1799–1889), American politician who served as United States Secretary of War for Abraham Lincoln.
 Charles C. Davis (1830–1909), United States Army Medal of Honor recipient during the American Civil War.
 William Findlay (1768–1846), governor of Pennsylvania; later served as director of the U.S. Mint.
 John Augustus Fritchey (1857–1916) Three-term Gilded Age mayor of Harrisburg (1887–93 and 1899–1902).
 John White Geary (1819–1873), first mayor of San Francisco, governor of the Kansas Territory, governor of Pennsylvania, and Union general in the American Civil War.
 Jacob Samils Haldeman (1821–1889), Pennsylvania State Representative, U.S. Ambassador to Sweden from 1861 to 1864
 Richard Jacobs Haldeman (1831–1886), Democratic member of the U.S. House of Representatives from Pennsylvania.
 John Andre Hanna (1762–1805), United States Representative from Pennsylvania; delegate to the State convention to ratify the U.S. Constitution; appointed brigadier general during Whisky Insurrection of 1793.
 Robert Harris (Pennsylvania) (1768–1851), member of the U.S. House of Representatives from Pennsylvania. Cousin to John Harris.
 John Christian Kunkel (1816–1870), Whig and Republican member of the U.S. House of Representatives from Pennsylvania; grandfather of John Crain Kunkel.
 George Kunkel (1893–1965), Pennsylvania State Senator
 John Crain Kunkel (1898–1970), US Congressman.
 Vance C. McCormick (1872–1946), politician and prominent businessman; appointed chair by President Woodrow Wilson of the American delegation at the Treaty of Versailles in 1919.
 Benjamin Franklin Meyers (1833–1918), Democratic member of the U.S. House of Representatives from Pennsylvania.
 William Henry Miller (1829–1870), Democratic member of the U.S. House of Representatives from Pennsylvania.
 Jesse Miller (1800–1850), Jacksonian member of the U.S. House of Representatives from Pennsylvania.
 Ray Coleman Mueller (1912–1994), Professional baseball player
 Marlin Edgar Olmsted (1847–1913), Republican member of the U.S. House of Representatives from Pennsylvania.
 John James Pearson (1800–1888), member of the U.S. House of Representatives and judge from Pennsylvania.
 David Rittenhouse Porter (1788–1867), Pennsylvania Governor.
 Luther Reily (1794–1854), member of the U.S. House of Representatives from Pennsylvania.
 Charles "Dutch" Schesler (1900–1953), Major League Baseball Player.
 William K. Verbeke (1820–1898), early developer of Harrisburg, philanthropist, Mayor of Harrisburg.
 John Winebrenner (1797–1860), Religious leader, founder of the first Church of God in Pennsylvania.
 George Wolf (1777–1840), Governor of Pennsylvania.

See also
 List of Pennsylvania cemeteries
 List of cemeteries in the United States

References

External links

 
 The Political Graveyard

Gothic Revival architecture in Pennsylvania
1845 establishments in Pennsylvania
Cemeteries established in the 1840s
Cemeteries in Harrisburg, Pennsylvania
Cemeteries on the National Register of Historic Places in Pennsylvania
Historic districts in Harrisburg, Pennsylvania
History of Harrisburg, Pennsylvania
Historic districts on the National Register of Historic Places in Pennsylvania
National Register of Historic Places in Harrisburg, Pennsylvania
Rural cemeteries